Matakong is an island just off the coast of Guinea between the capital Conakry and the Sierra Leone border.

Nomenclature 

Matakong is also called Matakan.

Transport 

Matakong is the proposed port terminus of the heavy duty standard gauge Trans-Guinean Railway, aimed at transporting large iron and bauxite deposits to the coast, notably from the mines at Simandou, 650km west.  The proposed Bellzone iron ore mine at Kalia may also share this railway line.

New port 

A new deep water port is needed because, firstly, the port at Conakry is built out and there is no room, and secondly, because a new port at Matakong has better access though flatter ground to the hinterland.

A 20 km pier may be needed to reach deep water.

See also 

 Transport in Guinea
 Railway stations in Guinea
 List of deep water ports (void)
 List of Panamax ports

References 

Islands of Guinea
Islands of the North Atlantic Ocean